USCGC Escanaba (WHEC-64) was an  high endurance cutter built for World War II service with the United States Coast Guard. The war ended before the ship was completed and consequently she never saw wartime service.

Escanaba was built by Western Pipe & Steel at the company's San Pedro shipyard. Named after Escanaba A city in Upper Michigan, and the first Escanaba- wpg class-77 . She was commissioned as a patrol gunboat with ID number WPG-64 on 20 March 1946. Her ID was later changed to WHEC-64 (HEC for "High Endurance Cutter" - the "W" signifies a Coast Guard vessel).

Operational service
Escanaba was originally named Otsego after Otsego Lake in the state of New York. It was renamed in honor of the first Escanaba- wpg class-77 which was sunk during the Second World War. That cutter and a third still in service, were named for the city of Escanaba in the Upper Peninsula of Michigan. 
She was home ported at Alameda, California, from 1946 to 1954, and used for law enforcement, ocean station, and search and rescue operations in the Pacific. She was decommissioned and placed in storage from 1954 to 1957. From 1957 to 28 June 1973, she was stationed at New Bedford, Massachusetts, and used for law enforcement, ocean station, and search and rescue operations in the Atlantic.

In late November 1965, she assisted the US MV's American Pilot and Maumee Sun following their collision west of Cape Cod Canal. On 11 January 1966, she rescued two survivors from  after that ship sank in heavy seas with the loss of 32 lives. On 5 February 1967, she rescued two Cuban refugees from Elbow Cay. In January 1969, she was disabled 100 miles east of Virginia Beach, Virginia, when the aft bearing on the main motor burned out. She arrived at Norfolk, Virginia, on 20 January. From 28 December 1969 to 2 January 1970, she escorted the distressed East German MV Ange to Bermuda.

On 13 January 1970, she stood by the Norwegian MV Chandeleur in the mid-Atlantic until fire damage was repaired. Two days later, she escorted the distressed Norwegian MV Condo until Condo could proceed on her own. On 25 March 1970, she medevaced a crewman from the Korean MV Kumsong in the mid-Atlantic.

On 27 December 1970, Escanaba rescued 31 crewmembers from the rear section of the 540 feet Finnish tanker Ragny that had broken in two parts in a heavy mid-winter storm on 26 December about 600 miles South-East of Cape May. The six men that were stranded on the bow section, as well as one seaman of SS Platte who disappeared during an attempted rescue of Ragny'''s crew, perished in the accident. Escanaba crew was awarded the Coast Guard Unit Commendation and the Finnish Lifesaving Medal for the rescue.Escanaba was decommissioned on 28 June 1974 and scrapped.

Footnotes

References
 Jane's Fighting Ships 1949-50. New York: McGraw-Hill Book Company Inc., 1949, p. 402.
 Scheina, Robert L.: U.S. Coast Guard Cutters & Craft of World War II Annapolis: Naval Institute Press, 1981, pp. 1–3.
 Scheina, Robert L.: U.S. Coast Guard Cutters & Craft, 1946-1990'' Annapolis: Naval Institute Press, 1990, pp. 18–26.

 

Owasco-class cutters
Ships of the United States Coast Guard
Ships built in Los Angeles
1945 ships